Brinkin is a northern suburb of Darwin, the capital city of the Northern Territory, Australia.

History
Brinkin is named after an Aboriginal tribe who inhabited an area to the south of the Daly River mouth. The streets in Brinkin are named after boats which serviced the coast of northern Australia.

The suburb was constructed in 1984, and the university followed several years later.

Geography
Brinkin is located on Darwin Harbour coastline at the southern end of Casuarina Beach, and is bounded by Trower Road to the north, Ellengowen Drive to the east and part of Rapid Creek and a stormwater drain to the south. The suburb consists of a few residential blocks to the north of the university, the university itself, a coastal reserve and part of the Rapid Creek Wetlands.

Ellengowan Drive in Brinkin was named after the SS Ellengowan, the oldest known shipwreck in Darwin harbour.

Demographics
The population of Brinkin was predominantly Australian-born – 63.05% as at the 2006 census – while 4.41% were born in the United Kingdom. Other significant groups include those of Greek (9.2%), Chinese, Italian, Indian and South East Asian descent. 3.4% of residents identified as Indigenous Australians. The main occupations of Brinkin residents are in the public service, education and health. The most popular religious affiliations in descending order in the 2006 census were Roman Catholic, no religion, Anglican, Greek Orthodox and Uniting.

The population of Brinkin grew to 1,129 in the 2011 census and 1,268 in the 2016 census. In the 2021 census there were 1,117 people living in Brinkin.

References

External links

Darwin suburbs map

Suburbs of Darwin, Northern Territory